Přindiš is a Czech surname. Notable people with the surname include:

Oskar Přindiš (1947–2012) Czech painter
Pavel Přindiš (born 1961) Czech slalom canoeist
Petr Přindiš (born 1989) Czech ice hockey player
Vít Přindiš (born 1989) Czech slalom canoeist

Czech-language surnames